Come and Hug Me is a 2018 South Korean television series starring Jang Ki-yong, Jin Ki-joo and Huh Joon-ho. It aired on MBC from May 16 to July 19, 2018.

Synopsis
A man and a woman who were each other's first loves during childhood reunite years later as adults.

In his childhood, Yoon Na-moo was a seemingly quiet and mysterious boy whose father was a psychopath serial killer. He meets his polar opposite in Gil Nak-won, a daughter of a popular actress. Through Nak-won's persistence, pure and loving nature towards Na-moo, Na-moo falls into a reciprocated love. But, when Na-moo's father Yoon Hee-jae, a man who has a twisted affection for his son, murders Nak-won's parents their short love comes to an end.

Years later Gil Nak-won is now Han Jae-yi, an aspiring actress (like her mother before her) who always tries to have a good outlook on life, but also has a panic disorder from her traumatic past. And Yoon Na-moo is now Chae Do-jin, a rookie detective who wishes to atone for his father's sins.
These two would-be lovers have held on to the precious memories of when they were together but, connected by a tragic fate they must try to overcome the stigma and hardships they will face.

Cast

Main
Jang Ki-yong as Chae Do-jin 
Nam Da-reum as young Chae Do-jin / Yoon Na-moo
A rookie detective who graduated from police university at the top of his class. He has never forgotten his first and only love, Nak-won, for whom he felt guilty since his father killed her parents. He later became Jae-yi's boyfriend.
Moon Woo-jin as child Chae Do-jin
Jin Ki-joo as Han Jae-yi
Ryu Han-bi as young Han Jae-yi / Gil Nak-won
A woman with a posttraumatic stress disorder who dreams of becoming an actress like her mother, and though she has suffered greatly, she overcomes it and vows to live well. She never blamed Do-jin despite him being the son of her parents' killer. She eventually becomes Do-jin's girlfriend.
Huh Joon-ho as Yoon Hee-jae
Chae Do-jin's father. A psychopath serial killer who gives twisted affection to his son and shows no remorse. He murdered Jae-yi's parents and countless others. After Do-jin called the police, he was arrested and sentenced to death after the court found him guilty of twelve murders. He later escaped from prison and commit a few more crimes (including two murders), and tries to mould Do-jin into a killer by kidnapping and killing Jae-yi, but he failed and Do-jin arrested him.

Recurring
Yoon Jong-hoon as Gil Moo-won / Lim Tae-kyung
Jung Yoo-ahn as young Gil Moo-won / Lim Tae-kyung
A prosecutor and Han Jae-yi's adopted brother, who cares for his sister. He is wary and distrusting of Chae Do-jin since Do-jin was the son of his foster parents' killer. It was revealed that he was the murderer of his parents' killer but he was acquitted due to his extremely young age and it was a killing done out of self-defence. He eventually trusts Do-jin and in the finale, he approves his sister's relationship with Do-jin.
Kim Kyung-nam as Yoon Hyun-moo 
Kim Sang-woo as young Yoon Hyun-moo
Chae Do-jin's elder brother. He has a violent personality and tries to follow his psychopathic father's footsteps, and he felt jealous towards Do-jin for being his father's most favourite child, which was compounded by the hatred he felt against Do-jin for reporting their father to the police.
Kwon Hyuk-soo as Kim Jong-hyun 
Chae Do-jin's close friend and fellow cadet at the police academy. 
Seo Jeong-yeon as Chae Ok-hee 
Chae Do-jin's stepmother. She was Hee-jae's wife from the fourth marriage, and she treats Do-jin as her own child. She repeatedly tries to open up to Hyun-moo and accept him, but Hyun-moo rejects her kindness, until much later in the series when Hyun-moo finally opens up to her.
Choi Ri as Chae Seo-jin
Lee Ye-won as young Chae So-jin
Chae Do-jin's younger stepsister. She was the daughter of Ok-hee and another man (prior to her marriage to Hee-jae), but she still regards Do-jin and Hyun-moo as her brothers despite having no blood relations to them.
Lee Da-in as Lee Yeon-ji
The sole female police detective of Do-jin's unit, and Do-jin's former classmate in the police academy. She sympathises with Do-jin and befriend him despite knowing Do-jin's father's identity.
Joo Woo-jae as Kang Yoon-sung
An actor who was the co-star of Jae-yi's drama. 
Jung In-gi as Go Yi-seok 
A police detective who investigated Hee-jae's case and was a mentor of Do-jin in the police force. He treats Do-jin with care and kindness. He was later killed by Hee-jae who escaped from prison.
Min Sung-wook as Kang Nam-gil
A senior police detective of Do-jin's team.
Kim Seo-hyung as Park Hee-young
An unscrupulous reporter who often make news reports about Hee-jae's case, and harasses both Do-jin and Jae-yi for the sake of getting more exclusive news reports related to Hee-jae as an advancement of her reporting career. She was murdered by Ji-hong who was earlier released from prison.
Yoon Ji-hye as Han Ji-ho 
A female reporter who was Hee-young's rival. She also tries to get a scoop regarding the Yoon Hee-jae serial murders by approaching Do-jin and Jae-yi. Unlike Hee-young, she is more morally-equipped and realises to an extent the negative impact the reports about Hee-jae's case has on Do-jin and Jae-yi.
Park Soo-young as Pyo-taek	
An obese, yet jovial and kind man who was Jae-yi's manager, and he cares about Jae-yi's welfare.
Jung Da-hye as Cheon Se-kyung 
A famous actress who was Hye-won's junior prior to Hye-won's murder. She may look unfriendly and cold, but she is actually warm-hearted and caring to people around her, especially to Jae-yi whom she sympathises for her trauma of losing her parents.
Park Kyung-choo as Gil Sung-sik
Han Jae-yi and Gil Moo-won's father. He is a lawyer who was murdered by Hee-jae.
Park Joo-mi as Ji Hye-won
Han Jae-yi and Gil Moo-won's mother. She is an actress who was murdered by Hee-jae for treating his son well.
Hong Seung-bum as Lee Seung-woo / Yeom Ji-hong
A ex-convict who idolizes Hee-jae (after meeting him in prison) and sought to become a serial killer like him. After his release from jail, Ji-hong killed Hee-young as revenge for Hee-jae and even assaulted several people in different secluded places.
Bae Hae-sun as Jeon Yoo-ra
An accomplice of Hee-jae, who helped him commit the serial murders.
Kim Hye-yoon as Yun-sil
Kim Ji-eun as Moo-won's office investigator
Chae Jong-hyeop as Jung Eui-ah

Special appearances
Song Young-kyu as Professor (ep 1)
Jang Gwang (ep 1)

Production
Nam Joo-hyuk and Bae Suzy were offered the leading roles of the series but both declined.
The first script reading was held between late March and early April at MBC Broadcasting Station in Sangam, South Korea.

Original soundtrack

Part 1

Part 2

Part 3

Part 4

Part 5

Part 6

Ratings
 In the table below,  represent the lowest ratings and  represent the highest ratings.
 NR denotes that the drama did not rank in the top 20 daily programs on that date.
 TNmS stop publishing their report from June 2018.

Regular broadcasting of the drama was cancelled on June 7, June 13, June 20 and June 27th due to coverage of the 2018 World Cup and local elections.
Episodes 19 and 20 were broadcast at 9:30 and 10PM instead of the regular broadcasting time of 10 and 10:30PM due to coverage of the 2018 World Cup.

Awards and nominations

Notes

References

External links
  

 

2018 South Korean television series debuts
2018 South Korean television series endings
Korean-language television shows
MBC TV television dramas
Serial killers in television
South Korean romance television series
South Korean melodrama television series
South Korean mystery television series
Television series by Imagine Asia